Mary Hill is an unincorporated community in Rock and Sheridan townships, Cherokee County, Iowa, United States.

References

Unincorporated communities in Cherokee County, Iowa
Unincorporated communities in Iowa